Alice L. Riddle Kindler (October 3, 1892 — 1980) was an American painter and teacher born in Germantown, Pennsylvania.

Education
Alice Riddle studied at the Pennsylvania Academy of the Fine Arts and at the Philadelphia School of Design for Women  After completing her studies, she won a trip to study in Europe for the summer and studied briefly at the Academie Julian in Paris. When she returned, Riddle entered and won a contest in 1915 to complete the murals for West Philadelphia High School. Two years later, Riddle won a prize from Gertrude Vanderbilt Whitney for the "Friends of Young Artists' Exhibition" held in New York City. In addition to winning the cash prize, she decorated a theater lobby as part of her award.

Personal life
Riddle married Hans Kindler in 1920 and soon after the marriage the couple moved to Senlis, France. For almost a decade Kindler did not paint, as she was raising her three children.

In 1929 her address was listed as being in Chantilly, France, and in 1939 the couple were living in Baltimore, Maryland Her husband was a cellist and conductor. She taught art at St. Timothy's School in Catonsville, Maryland. In 1939 Kindler was commissioned by the WPA to complete a mural for the post office in Ware Shoals, South Carolina. The WPA was the largest and most ambitious American New Deal agency, employing individuals to carry out public works projects. The finished product mural was completed in 1940 and titled, American Landscape.
 In 1959 Alice moved back to Senlis where she painted continually until 1975. Kindler died in London in 1980.

Work
 1915 "The Canterbury Pilgrimage" mural West Philadelphia High School, Philadelphia, Pennsylvania.
 1940 "American Landscape" United States Post Office mural, Ware Shoals, South Carolina.

References

1892 births
1980 deaths
20th-century American women artists
American muralists
20th-century American painters
American women painters
Artists from Pennsylvania
Pennsylvania Academy of the Fine Arts alumni
Works Progress Administration workers
Philadelphia School of Design for Women alumni
Women muralists